The 1979–80 Toledo Rockets men's basketball team represented University of Toledo as a member of the Mid-American Conference during the 1979–80 NCAA Division I men's basketball season. The team was led by head coach Bob Nichols and played their home games at Centennial Hall in Toledo, Ohio. Toledo won the MAC championship, finishing three games ahead of the field, and reached the NCAA Tournament for the second consecutive season (only time in program history), and finished with a record of 23–6 (14–2 MAC).

As of the 2022–23 season, this marks the most recent appearance in the NCAA tournament for the Toledo men's basketball program.

Roster

Schedule

|-
!colspan=9 style=| Regular season

|-
!colspan=9 style=| MAC Tournament

|-
!colspan=9 style=| NCAA Tournament

Rankings

Awards and honors
Jim Swaney  MAC Player of the Year

References 

1979–80 Mid-American Conference men's basketball season
1978–79
Toledo
Toledo Rockets men's basketball
Toledo Rockets men's basketball